HD 3167 is a single, orange-hued star in the zodiac constellation of Pisces that hosts a system with three exoplanets. The star is too faint to be seen with the naked eye, having an apparent visual magnitude of 8.97. The star is moving away from the Earth with an average heliocentric radial velocity of +19.5 km/s.

This is an ordinary K-type main-sequence star with a stellar classification of K0 V and no significant variability. The star has 86% of the mass of the Sun and 86% of the Sun's radius. It is a chromospherically inactive star and is radiating 56% of the Sun's luminosity from its photosphere at an effective temperature of 5,261 K. The spin of the star displays a relatively low projected rotational velocity of around 1.7 km/s. It has a near solar metallicity – a term  astronomers use for the proportion of elements other than hydrogen and helium in a stellar atmosphere.

In October 2021, astronomers reported that the orbits of the detected exoplanets hosted by the star are oddly unusual: two planets (HD 3167 c; HD 3167 d) revolve around the star on polar orbits, i.e. orbits that pass over the poles of the star, whereas the third planet (HD 3167 b) orbits around the equator of the star instead.

Planetary system
In 2016, data collected during the extended K2 mission of the Kepler space telescope was used to identify two transiting exoplanet candidates orbiting this star, designated HD 3167 b and HD 3167 c. This makes it one of the closest and brightest such multi-transiting stars known. The lack of chromospheric activity makes it ideal for the precise radial velocity (RV) measurements needed to estimate the masses of its planets. Follow-up RV observations showed additional perturbation signals beyond the two planets already identified. This led to the discovery in 2017 of a third, non-transiting planet, designated HD 3167 d.

It most likely has had its atmosphere stripped away by the host star, leaving a rocky planet with about 15% iron by mass.

The second planet, HD 3167 c, has an orbital period of 29.8454 days and an eccentricity of less than 0.267. This suggests either a mini-Neptune with a gaseous envelope consisting mainly of hydrogen and helium, or a planet consisting of mostly water. In 2020, transmission spectroscopy measurements of atmosphere has strongly favored the model with high (>700 Solar) metallicity of atmosphere, due to discovered molecular absorption bands which cannot be attributed to hydrogen or helium. The incident flux from the host star is around 16 times the amount the Earth receives from the Sun, and it is less susceptible to atmospheric stripping than HD 3167 b. 

The orbital inclination of HD 3167 d is inclined at least 1.3° away from the orbital planes of the other two exoplanets. Its orbit is expected to remain stable for periods longer than 100 million years only if this inclination is less than 40°. The true mass is most likely less than Neptune.

Fourth planet, a HD 3167 e, was discovered in 2022 by radial-velocity method.

References

K-type main-sequence stars
Planetary systems with four confirmed planets
Pisces (constellation)
Durchmusterung objects
003167
002736
J00345752+0422531